Miri-ye Khani-ye Yek (also Romanized as Mīrī-ye Khānī-ye Yek; also known as Mīrī-ye Khānī) is a village in Nehzatabad Rural District, in the Central District of Rudbar-e Jonubi County, Kerman Province, Iran. At the 2006 census, its population was 357, in 64 families.

References 

Populated places in Rudbar-e Jonubi County